Pogórze Przemyskie Landscape Park (Park Krajobrazowy Pogórze Przemyskie) is a protected area (Landscape Park) in south-eastern Poland.

Geography
It was established in 1991, and is a Natura 2000 EU Special Protection Area.

The Park lies within Podkarpackie Voivodeship: 
within Przemyśl County in Gmina Bircza, Gmina Dubiecko, Gmina Fredropol, Gmina Krasiczyn, Gmina Krzywcza, Gmina Przemyśl
within Rzeszów County in Gmina Dynów.

Within the Landscape Park are nine nature reserves.

See also

Special Protection Areas in Poland

References

Landscape parks in Poland
Parks in Podkarpackie Voivodeship
Przemyśl County
Rzeszów County
Natura 2000 in Poland
1991 establishments in Poland
Protected areas established in 1991